

The Falconar AMF-S14 Maranda is a two-seat, light aircraft first flown in Canada in 1961 and originally marketed for amateur construction by Falconar Avia.

Since the winding up of business by Falconar Avia in 2019, the plans are now sold by Manna Aviation.

Design
Based on the Adam RA-14 Loisirs, it is a conventional high-wing strut-braced monoplane with fixed, tailwheel undercarriage. The fuselage is wood construction with fabric covering with a folding wing. The pilot and single passenger sit side-by-side in a fully enclosed cabin. One example has been built as a floatplane with fiberglass covered wooden floats using Falconar plans. The airfoil employed is a NACA 23012.

Specifications (typical Super Maranda)

See also

References

External links
 Official website

1960s Canadian civil utility aircraft
Homebuilt aircraft
High-wing aircraft
Single-engined tractor aircraft
AMF-S14
Aircraft first flown in 1961